Niels Peter Nielsen (12 December 1876 – 26 September 1949) was a Danish stage and film actor.

Selected filmography
 Tabitha, Stand Up (1922)
 Little Dorrit (1924)
 The White Geisha (1926)
 The Clown (1926)
 Familien Olsen (1940)
 I de gode, gamle dage (1940)
 En mand af betydning (1941)
 The Burning Question (1943)
 Melody of Murder (1944)
 Besættelse (1944)

References

Bibliography 
 Waldman, Harry. Missing Reels: Lost Films of American and European Cinema. McFarland, 2000.

External links 
 

People from Randers
1876 births
1949 deaths
Danish male stage actors
Danish male film actors
Danish male silent film actors
20th-century Danish male actors
People from Favrskov Municipality